Donté Lamar Stallworth (born November 10, 1980) is a former American football wide receiver who played ten seasons in the National Football League (NFL). He played college football at Tennessee and was drafted by the New Orleans Saints in the first round of the 2002 NFL Draft.

Stallworth also played for the Philadelphia Eagles, New England Patriots, Cleveland Browns, Baltimore Ravens, and Washington Redskins.

Early years
Stallworth was born in Sacramento, California. He attended Grant Union High School in Sacramento, California where he was a star in football and track and field, PR of 10.49 seconds in the 100 meters and 7.16 meters in long jump. He was a high school teammate of former Minnesota Vikings running back Onterrio Smith and Tampa Bay Buccaneers wide receiver Paris Warren.

College career
Stallworth played college football at the University of Tennessee for the Volunteers, where his nickname was "Hands," as his teammates watched his ability to come up with seemingly impossible catches on a regular basis. Upon leaving for the NFL, his 1,747 reception yards ranked ninth in the school's all-time list. He majored in psychology.

Professional career

New Orleans Saints
Stallworth was selected by the New Orleans Saints in the first round (13th overall) of the 2002 NFL Draft. He made his NFL debut versus the Tampa Bay Buccaneers on September 8. He caught eight touchdown passes in 2002, his rookie year, but saw less action the next season. As a full-time starter in 2004, he had 767 receiving yards and five touchdowns. In 2005, he recorded a career-high 70 receptions for 945 yards with seven touchdowns.

Philadelphia Eagles

On August 28, 2006, Stallworth was traded to the Philadelphia Eagles for linebacker Mark Simoneau and a conditional fourth round pick in the 2007 NFL Draft. In Stallworth's first game with the Eagles, less than two weeks after the trade, he caught six passes for 141 yards and a touchdown. Due to a nagging hamstring injury, he missed three games early in the regular season, but finished the year with 725 yards and five touchdowns. Hamstring injuries have been a persistent problem throughout his professional career.

In March 2007, The Philadelphia Inquirer reported that Stallworth was in the league substance abuse program.

First stint with Patriots
On March 11, 2007, Stallworth agreed to terms with the New England Patriots on a reported six-year deal worth $30 million with $3.5 million guaranteed. The contract was incentive laden, meaning that the Patriots could release him if he underperformed for a small fraction of the full contract. Stallworth was a member of the famous  2007 Patriots, who went 16-0 in the regular season before losing in Super Bowl XLII to the New York Giants. On February 22, 2008, the Patriots declined the option on his contract and he became a free agent.

Cleveland Browns
On March 1, 2008, Stallworth signed a seven-year, $35 million deal with the Cleveland Browns. However, he had just 17 catches for 170 yards and one touchdown for the Browns in 2008 and then missed the entire 2009 season after being suspended by the NFL following his conviction on manslaughter charges. On February 8, 2010, after being reinstated by the NFL, the Browns terminated Stallworth's contract.

Baltimore Ravens
On February 16, 2010, Stallworth signed a one-year, $900,000 deal with the Baltimore Ravens.

On August 28, 2010, Stallworth broke his foot in a preseason game against the New York Giants. Head Coach John Harbaugh stated that this injury was not season-ending and Stallworth would be back after the Ravens' bye week. Stallworth made his return to the active Ravens roster in October, but his highlight of the season came during a game against the Carolina Panthers where he made his first catch as a wide receiver for the franchise during a regular season game.

On December 23, 2010, Stallworth was voted by his teammates and awarded the Ed Block Courage Award for 2010. But his stats were grim. He had just two receptions for 82 yards, and five rushes for 45 yards.

First stint with Redskins
Stallworth signed a one-year deal with the Washington Redskins on July 29, 2011.
On November 8, 2011, Stallworth was released by the Washington Redskins and put on waivers. 
On November 15, 2011, he re-signed with the Redskins after wide receiver, Leonard Hankerson, and defensive end, Kedric Golston, were put on injured reserve.
After his return to the team, Stallworth would catch a touchdown pass in the endzone in Week 11 against the Dallas Cowboys allowing the Redskins to go into overtime.
At the end of 2011 season, Stallworth recorded 22 receptions, 309 receiving yards, and two touchdowns.

Second stint with Patriots
On March 19, 2012, Stallworth signed with the New England Patriots. On August 27, 2012, Stallworth was released by Patriots. On December 3, 2012, Stallworth re-signed with the Patriots because of a broken right foot suffered by wide receiver Julian Edelman and lack of depth at the wide receiver position.
On December 11, it was reported that Stallworth was placed on injured reserve with an ankle injury after only playing in one game during his brief return and making a 63-yard reception for a touchdown.

Second stint with Redskins
Stallworth re-signed with the Redskins on June 12, 2013. On August 26, 2013, Stallworth was waived by the Redskins.

NFL career statistics
Receiving stats 

Returning stats

Rushing stats

Journalism
In September 2014, Stallworth was hired by The Huffington Post for a six-month fellowship covering national security politics full-time, based in the company's Washington, D.C., office. Although the fellowship lasted six months, Stallworth expressed hope that he would be hired permanently.  In 2016 Stallworth was hired by Daveed Gartenstein-Ross at Valens Global as a Strategy Consultant.  Stallworth's work at Valens focuses on securing and hardening public venues against terror attacks.

Personal life

DUI manslaughter charges
On the morning of March 14, 2009, Stallworth struck and killed a pedestrian while driving his car at the eastern end of the MacArthur Causeway in Miami Beach, Florida.

Around 7:15 a.m., Stallworth was headed toward the beach, driving a black 2005 Bentley Continental GT about 50 mph in a 40 mph zone, according to a Miami Beach Police report. Mario Reyes, 59, was on the busy causeway, trying to catch a bus home after finishing his shift. Stallworth claims that he flashed his car's headlights to warn Reyes. Stallworth struck Reyes with his car, killing him.

In a police investigation, Stallworth admitted to drinking the night before the accident. News sources reported that his blood alcohol content was 0.12, over the legal limit of 0.08.

On April 1, 2009, Stallworth was charged with DUI manslaughter; he surrendered to police on April 2, 2009, and was released on $200,000 bail. Under a plea deal, he received a sentence of 30 days in the county jail, plus 1,000 hours of community service, two years of community control, and eight years' probation. His Florida state driver's license was permanently suspended. On July 10, 2009, Stallworth was released from county jail after serving 24 days of a 30-day sentence.

The Associated Press reported on June 16, 2009, that Stallworth and the Reyes family reached a financial agreement, avoiding a civil lawsuit. The amount of the settlement was not disclosed.

On August 13, 2009, NFL commissioner Roger Goodell said Stallworth would be suspended for the 2009 season without pay.  Stallworth was reinstated after Super Bowl XLIV.

A Yahoo! Sports story reported that Stallworth's lawyers claimed he could have fought all charges, but that Stallworth chose to be convicted of a felony.

Balloon injury 
Stallworth was hospitalized with serious burns on March 16, 2013, after the hot air balloon carrying him and two other people crashed into power lines above South Florida.

References

External links
 

1980 births
African-American players of American football
American football wide receivers
American people convicted of manslaughter
American sportspeople convicted of crimes
Baltimore Ravens players
Cleveland Browns players
Living people
Manslaughter trials
New England Patriots players
New Orleans Saints players
Philadelphia Eagles players
Players of American football from Sacramento, California
Tennessee Volunteers football players
Washington Redskins players
21st-century African-American sportspeople
20th-century African-American people
Ed Block Courage Award recipients